Top R&B/Hip-Hop Albums is a music chart published weekly by Billboard magazine that ranks R&B and hip hop albums based on sales in the United States and is compiled by Nielsen SoundScan. The chart debuted as Hot R&B LPs in the issue dated January 30, 1965 in an effort by the magazine to further expand into the field of rhythm and blues music. It then went through several name changes, being known as Soul LPs in the 1970s and Top Black Albums in the 1980s, before returning to the R&B identification in 1990 and affixing a hip hop designation in 1999 to reflect the latter's growing sales and relationship to R&B during the decade.

From 1965 through 2009, the chart was compiled based on reported sales at a core panel of stores with a "higher-than-average volume" of R&B and/or hip-hop album sales to monitor buying trends of the African-American community. This panel included more independent and smaller chain stores compared to the high percentage of mass merchants that account for overall album sales. The core panel of stores continued to be monitored with the advent of SoundScan technology in the early 1990s but was dissolved at the end of 2009 when the methodology of the chart changed to "recap overall album sales of current R&B/hip-hop titles."

Billboard'''s respective top R&B and rap albums charts, which respectively rank contemporary R&B and rap albums within their own charting positions are consolidated into the overall Top R&B/Hip-Hop Albums chart.

 Chart name history 
The chart debuted in 1965 as the Hot R&B LPs. In 1969, Billboard renamed both singles and albums contingents of the R&B charts as Soul charts. In 1978, they were renamed again as Hot Black Singles and Top Black Albums. In 1990, the charts returned to the R&B designation (Top R&B Albums, Hot R&B Singles). In 1999, Billboard renamed them again as Top R&B/Hip-Hop Albums and Hot R&B/Hip-Hop Singles & Tracks, in an effort to recognize the growing sales of hip hop music and the genre's influential relationship to contemporary R&B.

Album achievements
Most weeks in top ten

Most weeks on chart

 Top Rap Albums Billboard began the Top Rap Albums chart on the weekend of June 26, 2004, although its first publication on print commenced on the week of November 20, 2004. Pop Smoke's posthumous debut, Shoot for the Stars, Aim for the Moon holds the record of most weeks at number one on the chart with twenty non-consecutive weeks.

Albums with the most weeks at number one

Artists with the most number-one albums

 Top R&B Albums Billboard introduced the Top R&B Albums chart in 2013 for R&B-specific albums, returning the use of the chart name for the first time since the original chart changed to its more encompassing title in 1999. The Weeknd's After Hours leads all acts with 40 weeks at number one on the chart.

 Most weeks at number one 

References

Whitburn, Joel (2000).  Top R&B Albums:  1965-1998.''  Record Research.

External links
 Yearly Billboard Top 5 R&B Hip-Hop Albums 1966-2006

Billboard charts